Yingshan County is a county in the northeast of Sichuan Province, China. It is the easternmost county-level division of the prefecture-level city of Nanchong.

Climate

References

County-level divisions of Sichuan
Nanchong